Granite Shoals is a city in Burnet County, Texas, United States. The 2010 census population was 4,910.

Geography

Demographics

2020 census

As of the 2020 United States census, there were 5,129 people, 1,676 households, and 1,333 families residing in the city.

2000 census
As of the 2000 census, there were 2,040 people, 825 households, and 593 families residing in the city. The population density was 828.3 people per square mile (320.2/km2). There were 1,224 housing units at an average density of 497.0/sq mi (192.1/km2). The racial makeup of the city was 86.57% White, 1.13% African American, 0.74% Native American, 0.05% Asian, 0.05% Pacific Islander, 10.44% from other races, and 1.03% from two or more races. Hispanic or Latino of any race were 21.18% of the population.

There were 825 households, out of which 27.6% had children under the age of 18 living with them, 59.3% were married couples living together, 8.1% had a female householder with no husband present, and 28.1% were non-families. 22.2% of all households were made up of individuals, and 10.9% had someone living alone who was 65 years of age or older. The average household size was 2.47 and the average family size was 2.87.

In the city, the population was spread out, with 23.9% under the age of 18, 7.0% from 18 to 24, 25.8% from 25 to 44, 23.8% from 45 to 64, and 19.5% who were 65 years of age or older. The median age was 40 years. For every 100 females, there were 100.8 males. For every 100 females age 18 and over, there were 96.3 males.

The median income for a household in the city was $31,283, and the median income for a family was $34,053. Males had a median income of $24,948 versus $20,000 for females. The per capita income for the city was $17,434. About 10.6% of families and 14.4% of the population were below the poverty line, including 20.6% of those under age 18 and 7.1% of those age 65 or over.

History
Granite Shoals was incorporated as a city by a vote of area residents in 1966. The original city comprised various sections of the Sherwood Shores subdivision, which was at the time the largest platted subdivision in the state of Texas. The Sherwood Shores subdivisions were created from the Phillips, Naumann and Ebeling ranches in 1962. In November 2005, residents voted to adopt a home rule charter to govern the city. In 2006, the city hired its first city manager.

The major industry in Granite Shoals is granite mining, and the city is popular with lake enthusiasts with its 18 city parks, 14 of which are located on Lake Lyndon B. Johnson. The city's municipal complex is home to the Andy Roddick Foundation International Tennis Center, a planned center of 18 adult courts and at least two QuickStart courts for kids. The QuickStart courts became operational in 2010, and fundraising events are in place for the remainder of the center. In 2011, the city received a grant to fund the Leonel Manzano Hike, Bike and Run Trails at its municipal complex, which will have 2-mile and 1/2-mile trails. Leonel Manzano grew up in Granite Shoals. The city is undergoing strong growth with the opening of a new bank and several new stores.

Schools
Students in Granite Shoals attend schools in the Marble Falls Independent School District, with elementary students attending Highland Lakes Elementary School in Granite Shoals, and middle and high school students travelling six miles to neighboring Marble Falls.

References

External links

 City of Granite Shoals official website
 

Cities in Burnet County, Texas
Cities in Texas
Populated places established in 1966